Prytanes confusus is a species of dirt-colored seed bug in the family Rhyparochromidae. It is found in the Caribbean, Central America, North America, and South America.

References

Further reading

 
 
 
 

Rhyparochromidae
Articles created by Qbugbot
Insects described in 1953